The Wye Bridge in Monmouth is a bridge across the River Wye. The A466 passes over it and immediately meets the A40 at its western end. The bridge is a grade II listed building.

History
The original wooden bridge was built in the Middle Ages; there is a clear reference to it in the fourteenth century. Earlier references to a bridge at Monmouth may refer either to a bridge over the Wye or to the fortified bridge over the Monnow, although local historian Keith Kissack wrote that the bridge was known to exist in 1282 when it formed a boundary with the Forest of Dean.  It was completely rebuilt in stone in the early seventeenth century (1615–17).  At that time, tolls were collected from all those crossing the bridge.

A plaque on the parapet records the widening of the bridge on both sides in 1878–80 under the architect Edwin Seward of Cardiff, stating, This bridge was widened 1879 from designs by the County Surveyor, David Roberts Contractor.

The bridge is built of red and buff sandstone ashlar. It has five arched spans with the original pointed arches visible beneath, but with both faces covered by segmental arches carried on the sharply pointed cutwaters.

Routes
The bridge is a crossing for the Wye but it is also the start of the Wysis Way which is a long footpath that connects Monmouth to the Kemble in Gloucestershire and to other National footpaths.

Gallery

See also
List of crossings of the River Wye
List of bridges in Wales

References

External links

Painting Wye Bridge and the Barkhouse, Monmouth by J. A. Evans, 19th century

Bridges in Monmouthshire
Bridges across the River Wye
Grade II listed bridges in Wales
Grade II listed buildings in Monmouthshire
Buildings and structures in Monmouth, Wales
Former toll bridges in Wales
Stone bridges in the United Kingdom